Dysgonia trogosema is a moth of the family Noctuidae first described by George Hampson in 1913. It is found in Africa, including Nigeria.

References

Dysgonia
Moths of Africa
Insects of West Africa